Abu-Ghraib is a district in Baghdad Governorate, Iraq.  Its hub is the city of Abu Ghraib. The population of the district was 189,000 as of 2003 100,000 people in the city of victory and peace and 89,000 people distributed to the rest of the judiciary..

Cities
Al Nasr Wal Salam  
Abu Ghraib 
Sadr al Yusufiyah  
Al Radwaniyah

References

Districts of Baghdad Province